Vasilko Konstantinovich (7 December 1209, in Rostov – 4 March 1238, in Sherensky forest) was the first Prince of Rostov. He was the son of Konstantin of Rostov, and the spouse of Maria of Chernigov. He died in the battle of the Sit River during the Mongol invasion of Kievan Rus' and was succeeded by his son Boris.

Sources
Pravoslavie website

1209 births
1238 deaths